Jankova is a settlement in the Municipality of Vojnik in eastern Slovenia. The entire area of the municipality was traditionally part of Styria. It is now included into the Savinja Statistical Region.

References

External links
Jankova at Geopedia

Populated places in the Municipality of Vojnik